Domi Gaz (also Romanized as Domī Gaz and Domey Gaz; also known as Dam-e-Gaz, Damīgaz-e Shomālī, Dam-i-Gazi, and Dom Gazī) is a village in Bord Khun Rural District, Bord Khun District, Deyr County, Bushehr Province, Iran. At the 2006 census, its population was 65, in 17 families.

References 

Populated places in Deyr County